Sannois is a railway station situated in Sannois, in the département of Val-d'Oise.

Line serving this station
 SNCF Gare Saint-Lazare (Banlieue) - Ermont — Eaubonne (Terminus)

See also
 List of stations of the Paris RER

External links
 

Railway stations in Val-d'Oise
Railway stations in France opened in 1863